Aqjangajuk Shaa (17 March 1937 – 2019) was an Inuit artist. He was born at Shartoweetuk camp near Cape Dorset, Nunavut.

He is known for his stone carvings, including a pink granite inuksuk that currently stands at the Scott Polar Research Institute. He also made one print, Wounded Caribou, in 1967. His brother Kavavaow Mannomee (born 1958) is also an artist.

He was elected to the Royal Canadian Academy of Arts in 2003.

His work is held in a variety of museums, including the Portland Art Museum  the University of Michigan Museum of Art, the University of Lethbridge Art Collection, the Montreal Museum of Fine Arts, and the Metropolitan Museum of Art.

References

External links
Artnet

1937 births
2019 deaths
Inuit artists
20th-century Canadian sculptors
People from Kinngait
Inuit sculptors
Inuit printmakers
Artists from Nunavut
Inuit from Nunavut
Canadian male sculptors
20th-century Canadian male artists